Thomas Himmelfreundpointner (born 22 December 1987) is an Austrian professional footballer who plays as a midfielder for Austrian club ASK St. Valentin in the fourth-tier OÖ Liga.

Club career
Himmelfreundpointner began his career in the lower tiers of Austrian amateur football with SV Losenstein and ATSV Neuzeug. He joined fourth-tier club SV Sierning in 2009, scoring in his first league appearance on 18 August. In his three seasons with the club he made 75 appearances and scored 14 goals. In 2012 he moved up another level and joined Regionalliga side Union St. Florian. He missed a significant portion of his second year with a torn ligament in his shoulder, but still made 68 league appearances and scored seven goals in three seasons.

In 2015, Himmelfreundpointner signed with fellow Regionalliga side Vorwärts Steyr, the club he had supported in his childhood. He helped them secure promotion to the Austrian Football Second League in 2017–18, completing his path to professional football.

Himmelfreundpointner made his second-tier debut on 27 July 2018, playing the full 90 minutes of a 1–1 draw with SV Ried. After starting goalkeeper Reinhard Großalber's retirement in April 2020, he became team captain and was signed to an extension.

References

External links
 
 
 Thomas Himmelfreundpointner at Austrian Football Association

Living people
1987 births
Austrian footballers
Association football midfielders
Union St. Florian players
SK Vorwärts Steyr players
2. Liga (Austria) players
Austrian Regionalliga players
Austrian Landesliga players
People from Steyr
Footballers from Upper Austria